The men's singles event was held over two days. On February 3 at 18:00 the short program was held while the free skating took place on February 4 at 17:30.

Schedule
All times are Almaty Time (UTC+06:00)

Results

References

Results

External links
 Official website

Men